Thérèse Kolb (1856–1935) was a French stage and film actress.

Selected filmography
 In Old Alsace (1920)
 Yasmina (1927)
 The Ladies in the Green Hats (1929)
 The Crime of Sylvestre Bonnard (1929)
 An Ideal Woman (1929)
 Island of Love (1929)

References

Bibliography
 Goble, Alan. The Complete Index to Literary Sources in Film. Walter de Gruyter, 1999.

External links

1856 births
1935 deaths
French film actresses